Ahqaf al Jabbarat  is a village  in the District of Jebel el-Akhdar in north-eastern Cyrenaica, Libya. Ahqaf al Jabbarat is located about 21 km southwest of the city of Beida.

References

External links
Satellite map at Maplandia.com

Populated places in Jabal al Akhdar